Pasiphila rivalis is a moth in the family Geometridae. It is endemic to New Zealand.

References

Moths described in 1916
rivalis
Moths of New Zealand
Endemic fauna of New Zealand
Endemic moths of New Zealand